Mary Hegarty is an Irish opera soprano singer.

Born in Fermoy, County Cork, she studied singing at the Cork School of Music with Maeve Coughlan, representing Ireland at an early stage at the Cardiff Singer of the World festival in 1985. She went on to study at the National Opera Studio in London and gave her Covent Garden debut in 1988. She also sang at Opera North and numerous other theatres and festivals across the British Isles. She is perhaps best known for film projects such as Match Point and Jonathan Dove's television opera Buzz on the Moon.

References

External links
www.maryhegarty.ie

20th-century Irish women opera singers
Irish sopranos
Living people
Musicians from County Cork
People from Fermoy
21st-century Irish women opera singers
Year of birth missing (living people)